Six ships of the Royal Navy have borne the name HMS Druid, after the Druids of Celtic polytheism, whilst another was planned:

  was a 10-gun sloop launched in 1761 and sunk as a breakwater in 1773.
  was a 16-gun sloop, formerly in civilian service under the name Brilliant. She was purchased in 1776, converted into a fire ship and renamed HMS Blast in 1779, and was finally sold in 1783.
  was a 32-gun fifth rate launched in 1783, converted into a troopship in 1798 and broken up in 1813.
  was a 46-gun fifth rate launched in 1825 and sold in 1863.
  was a wooden screw corvette launched in 1869 and sold in 1886.
  was an  launched in 1911 and sold in 1921.
 HMS Druid was to have been a  destroyer but she was renamed  in 1946 before being launched in 1952.

Royal Navy ship names